Emshwiller is a surname. Notable people with the surname include:

Carol Emshwiller (1921–2019), American writer
Ed Emshwiller (1925–1990), American illustrator
John R. Emshwiller, American journalist
Peter Emshwiller (born 1959), American writer, artist, magazine editor, filmmaker, and actor